This is a list of notable Azerbaijani film directors, which is arranged alphabetically.

B 
 Arif Babayev

I 
 Rustam Ibragimbekov

K 
 Farman Karimzade

M 
 Elchin Musaoglu

O 
 Rasim Ojagov

R 
 Anar Rzayev

S 
 Latif Safarov 
 Hasan Seyidbeyli
 Huseyn Seyidzadeh
 Abbas Mirza Sharifzadeh

T 
 Rza Tahmasib

See also 

 List of film directors by name
 List of Azerbaijani film producers
 List of Azerbaijani actors
 List of Azerbaijanis

 
Lists of film directors by nationality
Film directors